Princes Town or Pokesu is located 5 km east of Fort St. Antonio on Manfro Hill in the Ahanta West District of the Western Region of south Ghana. It lies between Axim to the west and Sekondi-Takoradi to the east. On 1 January 1681, a Brandenburger expedition of two ships commanded by Otto Friedrich von der Groeben arrived in the Gold Coast and began to build a strong fort between Axim and the Cape of Three Points. The fort was completed in 1683 and was named Fort Fredericksburg (German: Gross-Friedrichsburg) in honour of Prince Frederick William I, Elector of Brandenburg. Because the fort was named after a Prince, it has been referred to as Princes Town. The fort was to be the headquarters of the Brandenburgers in Africa.

History 
In 1708, an Akan merchant, John Canoe learned that the Germans were going to sell the fort to the Dutch. In protest, he began a resistance that managed to stave off fleets of battleships for almost 20 years. The fort was eventually captured in 1725 by the Dutch and renamed "Hollandia". Because John Canoe was successful in retaining control of the fort, inhabitants looked upon him as a hero. In 1872, the Dutch ceded the fort to Britain and in 1957, the fort became part of the newly independent country of Ghana.

"Junkanoo" festivals, named after John Canoe, such as Mardi Gras are held annually in the coastal outlines of North Carolina, in Jamaica and the Bahamas.

Fort Fredericksburg 

The Fort Fredericksburg was built of stone transported by sea between 1681 and 1683 from Prussia and is one of two German forts built in Ghana, the other being Fort Dorothea. It is estimated that some 300,000 Africans were transported through this fort. The remains of John Canoe are a mystery. Some have said he was captured after having lost the battle of the fort while others have said his remains are in the Tafo Cemetery in Kumasi. Because of its testimony to the Atlantic slave trade and the history of European colonial trade and exploitation, the fort was inscribed on the UNESCO World Heritage List in 1979 along with several other castles and forts in Ghana.

Sister cities 
List of sister cities of Princes Town, designated by Sister Cities International:

References

External links 
 Fredericksburg-Princes Town Sister City Association, Inc.

Populated places in Ahanta West Municipal District